Mark Gurashi was Albanian football player who played for SK Tirana during the 1930s, where he won the Kategoria superiore five times in just seven years and where he also won the golden boot for the 1934 season after scoring 12 league goals, which was the highest tally in a season since the league was created in 1930.

SK Tirana 
He featured in the 1st ever Albanian football championship, the Kategoria superiore 1930, a competition which he also won for the very first time in 1930. With SK Tirana he managed to win 5 championship titles, including the first ever one in 1930.

Honours
Albanian Superliga: 5 
 1930, 1931, 1932, 1936, 1937

References 

Year of birth missing
Year of death missing
Association football forwards
Albanian footballers
KF Tirana players
Kategoria Superiore players